Tombstone Junction was a small, Western-town-themed park located on Kentucky Route 90 in McCreary County, Kentucky near the Cumberland Falls State Resort Park. It began operating in the 1960s and continued uninterrupted until it was heavily damaged by fire in 1989. The park continued with limited operation until it was completely destroyed by a second fire in 1991. The venue featured a recreation of a small, Western frontier town complete with train station, working saloon, dance hall, jailhouse, shanties, and shops. There was also an outdoor amphitheater that hosted live shows featuring country and western music of the period.

The leading attraction at Tombstone Junction was a 2 1/2 mile ride aboard a full-sized standard-gauge operating steam train.

Background 

The park developed from the building and operation of a tourist railroad attraction called the "Cumberland Falls Scenic Railroad" in the 1960s. The railroad was built by Millard and Morris Stephens from nearby Whitley City as an attraction to complement The Falls Motel (also owned by the Stephens) which was near Cumberland Falls State Resort Park, both of which were a very short distance from the park itself.

The railroad was built and laid around the edges of a large cut between two mountains that had been filled in enough so that a 2½ mile "L" shaped circle of track could be laid. The building of the Cumberland Falls Scenic Railroad followed a small trend of insular purpose built scenic railroads which were built during the 1960s that developed into full-fledged parks. More famous examples include the "Rebel Railroad" in Pigeon Forge, Tennessee which eventually grew into what is known as the Dollywood theme park today and the Tweetsie Railroad in Blowing Rock, North Carolina, which is still in operation under that name to this day. The specific difference being that these two operations were built to accommodate smaller 36" narrow gauge equipment (as seen in many parks today) while the Cumberland Falls Scenic was a full sized standard gauge railroad.

For the second season of operation, the railroad's developers made in-house additions of buildings, shops, and The Red Garter Saloon using help from the local residents. The various stages of development of a functional park were planned out with each season adding new attractions, shops, stores and shows. The town portion of the park went by the operating name of "Tombstone Junction" and the railroad went by the operating name of "Old #77". However, the corporate name for the entire operation was "Cumberland Falls Scenic Railroad, Inc." Locals referred to the park as simply "The Junction."

The "Town" and Country Western Environment 

Outside of the scenic railroad the park consisted primarily of the "town" area of Tombstone Junction. This consisted of a faux western era town which was entered through a wooden fort entrance which housed the ticket office. The town consisted of the Red Garter Saloon were magic and stage shows were held, an outdoor theater where shows for park guest entertainers were staged, as well as several buildings such as the train station, jail, gift shops, boutiques, etc. A themed building known as "Pa's Cabin" which acted as a poor mans fun house allowed visitors to traverse a wilderness cabin where the interior floor had been slated at a steep angle. There was also a faux grave yard known as "Boot Hill".

Local residents were also used as characters to populate the town of Tombstone Junction. The local community was very involved in the park. The park focused on audience-involving stage shows, gunfights, music shows, and a group of gunfighters who interacted with the visitors. This was to make up for the fact that outside of the train ride the park never operated any mechanical rides.

Tombstone Junction was perhaps most known for bringing nationally known entertainers to the South Central Kentucky area and offering family entertainment to the area for a reasonable price.   Entertainers such as The Judds, Randy Travis, Dolly Parton, Kenny Rogers, Barbara Mandrell, Conway Twitty, and Loretta Lynn were part of the Sunday Concert Series that took place every Sunday from April to October.  Every Sunday brought a famous recording artist or band to The Junction and they performed on the Outdoor Stage.

The Cumberland Falls Scenic Railroad AKA Old 77

Old #77

The park's biggest attraction was "Old #77", a full-sized fully operational standard gauge steam train.

Passengers boarded and departed at the park's only station. This was situated almost directly in the center of the park and served as a focal point for the rest of the operation. The station also housed the park's business offices where files were kept and housed an extensive collection of autographed photos from country-western stars that had visited the park.

The route was a 2½ mile "L" shaped self-contained loop of track with the town of Tombstone Junction on one end that traveled through the wooded hills of the Falls area and came back again. The line featured steep overlooks, sharp turns, and rough track. It was actually a very close representation of what riding a hastily laid early 20th century rail line would have been. A prominent feature of the line was a steep grade the locomotive had to traverse just before the train would complete the loop and return to the park station. The grade started at 4% which then rose to 6% and the finally a short stretch that abruptly rose to 8% just before the train had to make an extremely tight 180 degree turn in front of the station to get positioned for the next trip. This turn being so tight that the grab irons on the fireman's side of the tender would scrape the grab irons on the back of the cab. This made for fantastic smoke and sound as the rod engine worked hard on what normally would have been a geared locomotive environment.

The 180-degree turn the line made in front of the train station was so tight that running the locomotive through it occasionally proved problematic. On one specific occasion the locomotive was being operated by engineer Bill Johnson and fireman Don Vanover, the locomotives sanders had accidentally been left on as it entered the curve which caused the drivers to "bite" the rail, this caused the locomotive to physically lift itself up and off the track. The derailment occurred next to the amphitheater stage just prior to the start of a Loretta Lynn performance. This was at the top of the 8% grade that the train had to pull which made re-railing the locomotive difficult.

At the trips halfway point, the ride featured a train robbery where the train was stopped by "bandits" who would rob the train until the Tombstone Junction sheriff rode up and had a drawing match with the ringleader. The winner varied.  The "robbery" was held at the bottom of the grade and was not only for the entertainment of the tourists, but also gave the engine crew time to service the engine and build a full head of steam to pull the steep mountain grade back into the park.

Additional to the ride loop was a short spur which lead to a small "yard" containing a storage track for additional equipment and a short track into a maintenance shed.

Locomotives and Cars 

The park owned three steam locomotives. When the railroad was originally built in the 1960s, two former U.S. Army  0-6-0T saddle tank locomotives were purchased as Army surplus with the idea that they would power the train ride. These locomotives were U.S. Army #5002 and #5014, both USATC S100 class tank engines, built by H.K. Porter & Co. in 1942. However, the steep grades proved too much for these engines and their use was abandoned almost from the start. These engines were moved to a spare equipment track next to the parks maintenance shed were they were displayed until the parks closing.

The third engine and the one that proved powerful enough to pull the train over the steep grades was a 90-ton 0-6-0 ALCO switcher originally built for the Union Railroad in Pennsylvania as their #77. #77 was a USRA design that had actually been developed by LIMA, but was contracted to be built by the American Locomotive Company at its Schenectady, New York works in January 1944 (serial number 71323). It was later sold to the Morehead and North Fork Railroad in Morehead, KY as their #14. After the M&NF dieselized on April 1, 1963, #14 was purchased for the park from the M&NF and renumbered back to #77. #77 was moved by rail from Morehead to the Kentucky and Tennessee Railway yards at Stearns, Kentucky. From there it was trucked into the park where it was put into operation on the tourist railroad.

The locomotives were hand painted and usually featured a paint scheme consisting of flat black and large hand painted banners with "Cumberland Falls Scenic RailRoad" in large block letters during the parks earliest years. Sometime in the 1970s this herald was changed to "Tombstone Junction Railroad"

The 5 passenger cars were modified wooden B&O Railroad cabooses. These had the cupolas removed, large open windows cut out of the sides, and seating installed from old scrapped school buses. The cars were painted a bright shade of red with large painted banners reading "Cumberland Falls Scenic Railroad" attached to the sides during the parks earliest years. In later years the coaches were painted each a bright shade of orange, blue, yellow, and green with a hand painted banner reading "Tombstone Junction". The 5th coach retained its original red color but saw less and less service in the parks later years and was usually seen on a side track as an "extra" coach.

Also on site was an old open top hopper car of unknown origin presumably used as ballast spreader car. This was kept on a siding next to the displayed 0-6-0T saddle tankers during the parks operation.

After Tombstone Junction ceased operation, the rail equipment was sold at auction. Harmon Taylor of Stearns, KY bought the 0-6-0 Alco "Old 77" so that it would stay in McCreary County. The two smaller locomotives were sold to other interests.

Number 77 as of 2018 is located in the old steam shop building of the Kentucky & Tennessee Railway in Stearns, KY. An attempt was made to restore the locomotive to operation for use on the Big South Fork Scenic Railway which operates over the K&T's tracks. Several years of restoration efforts ultimately failed to bring the locomotive back to operation. Major faults with project management ultimately led to the restoration effort being dropped after the expenditure of over 1.5 million dollars with a significant portion of that being provided by public funds. The engine was placed in storage in the back of steam shop building in a disassembled state. The restoration also resulted in the loss of a lot of the engines "original fabric" from the park days as the original tender was completely scrapped save for the steel deck and rebuilt new, the original cab was scrapped, as well as the original smoke box and major portions of plumbing deemed unfit for service.

0-6-0T #5002 was sold to a private collector who stored it at the Kentucky Railway Museum in New Haven, KY for several years. In 2016 it was moved from KRM to the Colebrookdale Railroad in Pennsylvania where a restoration effort was begun to restore it.  It was then sold again, and is now in a full rebuild by the military Railroad Society in Baraboo, WI

0-6-0T #5014 was sold to the California State Railroad Museum where it was used as a parts source in restoring their 0-6-0T Granite Rock Co. #10. Afterwards the remaining hulk of that locomotive were donated to a historical organization which placed it on display in Goldfield, Nevada.

The coaches and ballast car were scrapped on site after auction.

Red Garter Saloon & Outdoor Amphitheater Shows 

Stage shows were produced in The Red Garter Saloon and the outdoor stage.

The first Red Garter Saloon represented a "movie western" saloon featuring a main floor surrounded by an upper deck with more tables for extra seating. It also featured a saloon-type bar for beverage sales. In the center of the saloon was a large elevated stage complete with ornamental curtains where the shows were staged.  This building was where all of the music shows for the house band were performed. There were also special Saturday Night Concerts offered by the house band during the Summer which was a separate ticket event that took place after the "town" area of the park had closed for the day. This saloon burned near the end of the 1974 season.

When the 1975 season opened a new Red Garter Saloon opened with a raised stage on the south end and a fast food counter at the north end of the first floor.  The second floor of the Saloon housed apartments where members of the Stephens family (park owners) lived during the summer season. Another change occurred when the new saloon opened in that the house band's music shows moved to a new outdoor amphitheater stage and the new Red Garter Saloon became the permanent home of the magic shows. Three world-class magicians who "learned the ropes" of entertaining by beginning their professional careers at Tombstone Junction are Lance Burton, Mac King and Whit “Pop” Haydn.  During their years at The Junction these soon-to-be-famous magicians performed three shows a day in The Red Garter Saloon.

The outdoor amphitheater was where concerts were held starring local bands as well as famous name stars from the country and western music genre. Regulars included Conway Twitty and Loretta Lynn. The theater was an octagonal structure with a roof supported by posts covering rows of bench seats that spread from the stage in three tiers. There were no walls except the three that covered the back portion of the stage to force sound out into the crowd. There was no floor as the roof and stage were simply built over an open spot of gravel.

The saloon was damaged in 1989 by a fire that started the path to the parks closing; however concerts continued using the amphitheater until the park was fully shut down in 1991.

Decline 

The park was a popular local attraction but began to decline in the late 1980s. A number of reasons lead to the parks demise which included:

The deaths of Millard and Morris Stephens, who were the heart, soul, and visionaries for the park.  Millard Stephens died in November 1974 and Morris Stephens died in August 1976.

The economy of the area which the park was located was based almost entirely on the coal mining industry. The Kentucky coal industry basically imploded in the late 1980s with vast local economic turn down which continued far into the 1990s and in some places still continues to this day. This resulted in the parks local base (which was its primary support) being slashed as jobs and money dried up.

The rise of nearby Dollywood and Pigeon Forge, Tennessee as well as Gatlinburg, Tennessee reforming itself as the tourist Mecca that it remains today hurt attendance at Tombstone as well. The small park simply didn't have anything to offer that wasn't available (plus much more) as these places that were basically only a couple of extra hours down the road.

The remaining Stephens Family sold the park to another party in the spring of 1989. In late 1989 the park suffered a severe fire which served as the catalyst for the final downfall.

The End of the Park 

The park was heavily damaged by a fire in late 1989. The Red Garter Saloon was destroyed as well as several town buildings. The park operated in a limited fashion directly after the 1989 fire, hosting outdoor concerts and operating the train ride. However, a second fire in late 1990 or early 1991 destroyed the rest of the park except for some out-buildings and the train. With a dwindling customer base and no capital to rebuild the decision to end the operation was made. In 1992, what was left of the park was sold off at auction.

The Kentucky & Tennessee Railway in nearby Stearns, KY bought the track and a scrap company bought the old converted wooden cabooses. This resulted in the parks final notable incident. During the scrapping process of the wooden coaches, the bodies of the cars were accidentally set on fire with a cutting torch with the fire quickly getting out of hand. In a panic the scrap company employee not wishing to get blamed for damaging the #77 locomotive too which the cars were still attached pulled the coupling between the cars and the locomotive as well as quickly cut safety cables in the hopes the cars would roll away from the locomotive.

The cars now fully ablaze not only rolled away from the locomotive but continued to roll down the steep grade leading out of the park heading to the other end of the track loop. At the bottom of the hill, workers from the K&T Railway had begun the process of removing the rail. The cars ran into the removed track and piled on top of each other burning up in a heap. The remaining steel was scrapped on site.

The Park Today 

As of 2019, very little remains of Tombstone Junction. Mainly what is left is the bi-level parking lot and the rusting entrance gate. There is also the foundation of the saloon and the water stand pipe used to fill the locomotive's boiler for the train ride is still in place.

The most well preserved piece is "Pa's Cabin", the small cabin built with a tilted interior. This structure stood in relatively good condition until 2007. Since then, the roof has completely caved in.

The train station stood until the early 2000s when it was burned down by vandals. The concrete vault built inside the station still remains sitting on its foundation. The parks repair shop barn stood until around 2005 when it was also burned down by vandals.

Crossties and ballast from the railroad can still be found in certain spots.

The large sign that greeted people at the parking lot entrance located on KY 90 stood until around 2004–2005. It featured a large painted portrait of a gunslinger under an arched herald reading "Tombstone Jct". Under which a gas station like sign with moveable letters read what acts were playing in a particular week. This stood in reasonable condition through the 1990s but began to deteriorate quickly in the 2000s until collapsing completely. Some of the phone poles used to support the sign have been dragged over into the entrance-way in addition to large piles of chipped wood to hinder traffic from curious onlookers.

Photos and Video 

Another unique feature of Tombstone Junction is the rarity of photographs and almost utter lack of home video of the park in operation. Some photos are available among several blog websites of people who remember the park. These photos are usually from the 1970s era and mostly consist of pictures of and from the train. Pictures of the actual park are even rarer.

Home video of the park is almost non-existent; however, there is a rare video taken by the engineer of the train ride in 1989 just before the first fire and features probably the best (if short) views of the park in its last days of operation. The rest of the video consists of run-bys of the train as well as a trip around the entire track loop from the cab of the locomotive. This video can be found on YouTube if one searches the parks name.

External links
http://www.roadsideamerica.com/tip/7472
http://unusualkentucky.blogspot.fr/2008/05/tombstone-junction.html 

Amusement parks in Kentucky
Defunct amusement parks in the United States
Buildings and structures in McCreary County, Kentucky
Cowboy culture
Tourist attractions in McCreary County, Kentucky